
Gmina Tryńcza is a rural gmina (administrative district) in Przeworsk County, Subcarpathian Voivodeship, in south-eastern Poland.

Villages
Gmina Tryńcza contains the villages and settlements of Głogowiec, Gniewczyna Łańcucka, Gniewczyna Tryniecka, Gorzyce, Jagiełła, Tryńcza, Ubieszyn, Wólka Małkowa and Wólka Ogryzkowa.

Neighbouring gminas
Gmina Tryńcza is bordered by the gminas of Białobrzegi, Grodzisko Dolne, Jarosław, Leżajsk, Przeworsk and Sieniawa.

References

Polish official population figures 2006

Tryncza
Przeworsk County